Dingras, officially the Municipality of Dingras, is a 2nd class municipality in the province of Ilocos Norte, Philippines. According to the 2020 census, it has a population of 40,127 people.

Etymology

The Legend of Dingras

As in other communities, the town of Dingras has an interesting legend as to how its name evolved. The legend, as handed down from generation to generation, was classically romantic, a gallant heir - warrior fighting for a lady's love.

In the early times, there were two prosperous barangays in the present site of the town each one ruled by a powerful chief or datu. They were bitter and mortal enemies. Naslag was the powerful chief of the barangay north of the river while Allawigan was the chief of the south of the river. One day, Allawigan and his warriors went to hunt. Rass, his son, was the bravest among them. During the hunt, Ras followed the deer, which went north across the river. While he was watching the fleeing deer, he saw a beautiful damsel gathering wild flowers on the opposite side of the riverbank. She was Ding, the daughter of Naslag. To help the lady, Ras gathered the most beautiful flowers near him; put them at the head of his arrow and shoot near the lady's feet. Ding looked at the other side of the river and waved her hands. Ras went home happily.

Ras begged his father for permission to win Ding for his wife. But because the fathers of Ding and Ras were bitter enemies, the only way he could win her was in the open battle fiercely fought between the two tribes. Ras led his father's warriors. They fought valiant and came out victorious in the end. Ras asked for Ding as a prize but Naslag refused. This angered him and hurled a challenge to the bravest warrior of Naslag in single combat with Ding as prize. The challenge was accepted. The combat was fought and again, Ras was victorious. He brought Ding triumphantly to Allawigan, his father. Thereafter, the people named the two barangays Dingras, after Ras, their valiant warrior ruler, and Ding, his wife.

History
On January 27, 2000, Mayor Robert Castro was forcibly removed from his office by the police due to defying orders from the regional trial court issued nine days prior to step down after losing an electoral contest to Oswaldo Parado, who was found to have won the 1998 mayoral race by over 370 votes.

Geography
The Municipality of Dingras has a total area of 17,962 hectares, ranking 8th in size among the 23 municipalities including Laoag City. It accounts for practically 5.2% of the total land area of Ilocos Norte and corresponding percentage to the municipal area composed of thirty one (31) barangays. Six (6) are on the Poblacion and twenty five (25) in the rural area. Out of the total area 6,305 hectares is devoted to rice and corn production. Other non-productive areas are devoted to livestock production, swine production and other livelihood projects. Most of the population are engaged in farming as the primary source of income.

Barangays
Dingras is politically subdivided into 31 barangays. These barangays are headed by elected officials: Barangay Captain, Barangay Council, whose members are called Barangay Councilors. All are elected every three years.

Albano (Poblacion)
Bacsil
Bagut
Baresbes
Barong
Bungcag
Cali
Capasan
Dancel (Poblacion)
Elizabeth
Espiritu (Gabon)
Foz
Guerrero (Poblacion)
Lanas
Lumbad
Madamba (Poblacion)
Mandaloque
Medina
Parado (Bangay)
Peralta (Poblacion)
Puruganan (Poblacion)
Root 
Sagpatan
Saludares (Baldias)
San Esteban
San Marcelino (Padong)
San Marcos
Sulquiano (Sidiran)
Suyo
Ver (Naglayaan)

Climate

Demographics

Economy

Longest Bibingka
On October 9, 2007, Dingras, Ilocos Norte, Philippines eyed a "Guinness World Records" certification after baking a kilometer-long "bibingka" (native cake) made from 1,000 kilos of cassava and eaten by 1,000 residents.

List of Cultural Properties of Dingras

|}

Government
Dingras, belonging to the second congressional district of the province of Ilocos Norte, is governed by a mayor designated as its local chief executive and by a municipal council as its legislative body in accordance with the Local Government Code. The mayor, vice mayor, and the councilors are elected directly by the people through an election which is being held every three years.

Elected officials

References

Bibliography

External links

[ Philippine Standard Geographic Code]
Philippine Census Information
Local Governance Performance Management System 

Municipalities of Ilocos Norte